Mark Andrew Laforest (born July 10, 1962) is a Canadian former professional ice hockey goaltender. He played 103 games in the  National Hockey League (NHL) with the Detroit Red Wings, Philadelphia Flyers, Toronto Maple Leafs, and Ottawa Senators between 1985 and 1994. After retiring as a player, Laforest coached minor hockey in Wainfleet, Ontario.

Personal
Laforest's younger brother Bob also played in the NHL with the Los Angeles Kings.

Career statistics

Regular season and playoffs

Awards
1987, 1991: Aldege "Baz" Bastien Memorial Award (Outstanding Goaltender AHL)
1991: AHL Second All-Star Team (1991)

External links
 
Mark Laforest's profile at The Goaltender Home Page

1962 births
Living people
Adirondack Red Wings players
Binghamton Rangers players
Canadian ice hockey goaltenders
Detroit Red Wings players
Hershey Bears players
Ice hockey people from Ontario
Kalamazoo Wings (1974–2000) players
Milwaukee Admirals (IHL) players
New Haven Senators players
Newmarket Saints players
Niagara Falls Flyers players
North Bay Centennials players
Ottawa Senators players
Philadelphia Flyers players
Prince Edward Island Senators players
Sportspeople from Welland
Toronto Maple Leafs players
Undrafted National Hockey League players